3 Monkeys is an upcoming 2023 Indian Hindi-language heist thriller film directed by the duo Abbas–Mustan. The film is produced by Allarakha Vohra, Faruk Vohra, Sayeed Vohra and co-produced by Sharmin Vohra under the banner of AV Picture Production LLP. The film stars Arjun Rampal and Priya Prakash Varrier.

Cast 

 Arjun Rampal
 Priya Prakash Varrier
 Tunisha Sharma
 Abrar Zahoor
Colonel Ravi Sharma
 Rajesh Khattar
 Denzil Smith
 Ivan Sylvester Rodrigues
 Inderpal Singh
 Arpit Ranka
 Anant Mahadevan
 Jyoti Gauba
 Rio Kapadia
 Akashdeep Sabi

Production 
Principal Photography began on 13 November 2021 in Mumbai.

The cast includes Tunisha Sharma in a posthumous appearance following her death on 24 December 2022.

References

External links 
 

2020s Hindi-language films
2023 films
Films directed by Abbas–Mustan
Films scored by Tanishk Bagchi
Hindi-language thriller films
Indian action thriller films
Indian heist films
Upcoming films
Upcoming Hindi-language films
Upcoming Indian films